XYZ Rail Limited (formerly W.A. Developments Ltd. and Stobart Rail Limited and trading as XYZ Rail & Civils) is a railway maintenance and infrastructure engineering company in the United Kingdom.

History

The original company
XYZ Rail & Civils was founded on 25 May 1993 by William Andrew Tinkler as W.A. Developments Civil Engineering in Cumbria, with an initial capital investment of £500. The company was involved in civil engineering and railway infrastructure project contracts. The company gained a contract with Railtrack (now Network Rail). The business was incorporated as W.A. Developments Ltd.
The company's original registered office was in Gosforth, Cumbria

Acquisition of Eddie Stobart
W.A. Developments Ltd.'s parent company, WA Developments (International) Ltd (a company jointly owned by Andrew Tinkler and William Stobart), acquired Eddie Stobart Limited, the UK's largest haulage contractor, in February 2004. Following WA Developments' decision to merge Eddie Stobart Limited with the property and ports company the Westbury Property Fund on 15 August 2007 and to list it on the London Stock Exchange as the Stobart Group, W.A. Developments Ltd. initially remained within the ownership of WA Developments.

Sale to the Stobart Group
On 10 March 2008, Stobart Group announced that it would be buying the original W.A. Developments Ltd. civil engineering and railway infrastructure business from WA Developments for £10 million in cash. Upon completion, W.A. Developments Ltd. changed its name to Stobart Rail Limited and W.A. Developments Civil Engineering was re-branded Stobart Rail and subsequently Stobart Rail & Civils.

Divestment to Bavaria Industries Group AG
On 14 July 2020, the Stobart Group Ltd announced the sale of Stobart Rail & Civils to Bavaria Industries Group AG for an initial cash consideration of £1,000. On 13 October 2020 Stobart Rail Limited changed its name to XYZ Rail Limited.

Operations

XYZ Rail & Civils holds a Network Rail Principal Contractor's Licence and Rail Plant Operating Company Licence. Stobart Developments undertakes development projects and is delivering improvement works at a number of Stobart Group facilities, including constructing the London Southend Airport railway station, which it owns and operates.

See also
 Stobart Group

References

External links
 XYZ Rail & Civils official website

Post-privatisation British railway companies
British companies established in 1993
Transport companies established in 1993